Olena Grechykhina (born 11 July 1991) is a Ukrainian competitor in synchronized swimming.

She won 3 bronze medals at the 2013 World Aquatics Championships. She also won a gold and a silver at the 2014 European Aquatics Championships, a silver at the 2012 European Aquatics Championships, and a bronze at the 2010 European Aquatics Championships.

References
FINA profile

1991 births
Living people
Ukrainian synchronized swimmers
Olympic synchronized swimmers of Ukraine
Synchronized swimmers at the 2016 Summer Olympics
World Aquatics Championships medalists in synchronised swimming
Synchronized swimmers at the 2011 World Aquatics Championships
Synchronized swimmers at the 2013 World Aquatics Championships
Synchronized swimmers at the 2015 World Aquatics Championships
European Aquatics Championships medalists in synchronised swimming
Sportspeople from Donetsk
21st-century Ukrainian women